Rudolf Ismayr (14 October 1908 – 9 May 1998) was a German weightlifter. He won a gold medal at the 1932 Summer Olympics in Los Angeles and a silver medal at the 1936 Summer Olympics in Berlin, as well as a silver medal at the 1938 World Championships. Between 1931 and 1935 he set five official and six unofficial world records.

Ismayr took the Olympic Oath at the 1936 Summer Olympics in Berlin. Death unspecified.

References

1908 births
1998 deaths
Sportspeople from Landshut
German male weightlifters
Olympic weightlifters of Germany
Weightlifters at the 1932 Summer Olympics
Weightlifters at the 1936 Summer Olympics
Olympic gold medalists for Germany
Olympic silver medalists for Germany
World record setters in weightlifting
Olympic medalists in weightlifting
Medalists at the 1936 Summer Olympics
Medalists at the 1932 Summer Olympics
Oath takers at the Olympic Games
People associated with physical culture
20th-century German people